Jiban Saikate is a 1972 Bengali film based on the novel The Citadel by A. J. Cronin.  It was directed by Swadesh Sarkar and stars Soumitra Chatterjee, Aparna Sen and Dilip Roy. It was remade into the Telugu film Madhura Swapnam.

Plot

Song 
The music of this film by Sudhin Dasgupta.

Cast
 Soumitra Chatterjee
 Aparna Sen
 Dilip Roy

External links
 Calcutta Tube

References

1972 films
Bengali-language Indian films
Films set in India
Films based on works by A. J. Cronin
1970s Bengali-language films
Bengali remakes of Hindi films
Films scored by Sudhin Dasgupta